Sharpsburg is an unincorporated community in Marion County, in the U.S. state of Missouri.

History
A post office called Sharpsburg was established in 1850, and remained in operation until 1869. The community has the name of Richard Sharp, a pioneer minister.

Justice of the Supreme Court of Missouri William T. Ragland was born here.

References

Unincorporated communities in Marion County, Missouri
Unincorporated communities in Missouri